Ferhan is a given name. Notable people with the name include:
 Ferhan Azman, Turkish architect
 Ferhan Çeçen (born 1961), Turkish environmental engineer and chemist
 Ferhan Hasani (born 1990), Macedonian footballer
 Ferhan Önder (born 1965), Turkish-Austrian pianist
 Ferhan Şensoy (born 1951), Turkish playwright, actor, and stage director